Czesław Słania (22 October 1921 Czeladź; 17 March 2005 Kraków) was a Polish-born postage stamp and banknote engraver, living in Sweden from 1956. According to the Guinness Book of World Records, Słania was the most skilled and prolific of all stamp engravers, with over 1000 stamps to his credit. His 1000th engraved stamp, based on the 17th-century painting "Great Deeds by Swedish Kings" by David Klöcker Ehrenstrahl (2000), is in the Guinness Book as the largest engraved stamp ever issued.

Life 
Słania was born in Czeladź near Katowice, Poland, and was the son of a miner. During the Second World War he forged money and documents for the Polish resistance. He entered the Kraków School of Fine Arts, a renowned graphics arts centre, in 1945. While still a student, Słania was employed by the Polish Stamp Printing Works, where he learned to engrave in steel. His first stamp was issued in Poland on 24 March 1951.

In 1956, Słania moved to Sweden, where he began employment with the Swedish postal authorities in 1959. He produced stamps for Sweden and 30 other countries. His work was of such recognized quality and detail that he is one of the very few "household names" among philatelists, and some specialize in collecting his work.

He was the Royal Court Engraver of Sweden since 1972.

His last work was a stamp in 2005 to commemorate the 60th session of the United Nations General Assembly.

He was also very productive in designing and engraving banknotes for numerous countries in six out of seven continents.

Awards 
Czesław Słania received many awards during his life, including:

 Commander of the Order of Merit of the Republic of Poland 1999
 Order of Saint Charles
 Knight of the Order of the Dannebrog (Denmark)
 Order Mérite Culturel (Monaco)
 Robert Stolz Music Prize (Sweden 1983)
 Rowland Hill Award 2002

References

External links

Collecting the Works of Czeslaw Slania by Chuck Matlack
Czeslaw Slania's Engraved Stamps and Banknotes
Forging Nazi Documents and Drawing for Kings: Czesław Słania’s Story from Culture.pl
[[Category:Stamp designers]]

People from Czeladź
1921 births
2005 deaths
20th-century engravers
21st-century engravers
Polish stamp designers
Polish engravers
Polish expatriates in Sweden
Burials at Rakowicki Cemetery
Philately of Poland
Philately of Sweden
Commanders of the Order of Merit of the Republic of Poland
Recipients of the Order of Saint-Charles
Knights of the Order of the Dannebrog